Desoddharakudu is a 1986 Indian Telugu-language action drama film, produced by D. Murali Mohan Rao under the Vijayabhaskar Productions banner and directed by S. S. Ravi Chandra. It stars Nandamuri Balakrishna and Vijayashanti, with music composed by Chakravarthy.

Plot
The film begins in a village where Gopi (Nandamuri Balakrishna) is a naughty guy raised by his grandfather Shankaraiah (Rao Gopal Rao) along with his sister Lakshmi (Samyutha). He always performs mischievous deeds and Shankaraiah masks it to save his prestige. Once, a beautiful girl Vijaya (Vijayashanti) visits their village where her acquaintance with Gopi begins with petty quarrels. Later, she starts liking him after protecting her against harm. Meanwhile, Shankaraiah looks like a match for Lakshmi which breaks up because of Gopi's misdeeds and it leads to Shankaraiah's death. Right now, Gopi aims to acquire his recognition for which he moves towards the city. Parallelly, in another village two malicious Dharma Rayudu (Satyanarayana) & Narasimha Naidu (Nutan Prasad) carry out their barbarities and tries to overpower each other. Fortunately, Vijaya resides therein, the daughter of the School Master (Kantha Rao) who too a victim of their cruelty. So, she files a complaint when Govt appoints a special officer for it. Being cognizant of it, both the devil's alert to take hold of him. Fortuitously, Gopi lands there whom they mistake as the officer. Here Vijaya requests him to continue the role to protect the village. Soon, Vijaya civilizes and establishes him as a master of all fields. Thereafter, Gopi starts teasing Dharma Rayudu & Narasimha Naidu, bars their violations, and develops the village. So, avenged evildoers join together when the truth comes forward and it is revealed that the madman (Gollapudi Maruthi Rao) of the village is the real special officer. At last, Gopi ceases the baddies and the same bridegroom Venu (Arun Kumar) backs to marry Lakshmi witnessing the nobility of Gopi. Finally, the movie ends on a happy note with the marriage of Gopi & Vijaya.

Cast

Nandamuri Balakrishna as Gopi 
Vijayashanti as Vijaya
Rao Gopal Rao as Sankarayya
Satyanarayana as Dharma Rayudu
Gollapudi Maruthi Rao as Madman / Special Officer
Nutan Prasad as Narasimha Naidu
Kanta Rao as School Master
Sudhakar as Sivudu
Balaji as Papa Rao
Arun Kumar as Venu 
Suthi Veerabhadra Rao as Post Master
Rallapalli as Kotilingam
Jayabhaskar as Kondandam
Dr. Siva Prasad as Drama Contractor 
Mada as Eedukondalu
KK Sarma as Dr.Seshavatharam
Telephone Satyanarayana as Pichiswara Rao
Chitti Babu as Hanumanthu
Chidatala Appa Rao as Appigadu
Mallikarjuna Rao as Gedala Gavarraju
Mucharlla Aruna as Gowri 
Samyutha as Lakshmi
Kakinada Shyamala as Dharma Rayudu's wife
Kalpana Rai as Post Master's wife
Y. Vijaya as Seetallu

Soundtrack

Music composed by Chakravarthy. Lyrics were written by Veturi. Music released on Sapthaswar Audio Company.

References

1986 films
Films scored by K. Chakravarthy
1980s Telugu-language films